The following is a list of tourist attractions in Boston, Massachusetts. Some sites appear in multiple lists.

Historic sites and national parks

Black Heritage Trail
Boston Harbor Islands National Recreation Area
Boston National Historical Park
Castle Island
Custom House Tower
Dorchester Heights Monument
Freedom Trail – marked by a red line of bricks embedded in the ground
Boston Common (including Boston Public Garden)
Bunker Hill Monument
Faneuil Hall (Quincy Market is adjacent)
Granary Burying Ground
Massachusetts State House
Old North Church
Old State House
Paul Revere House
USS Constitution
Old City Hall

Museums, aquariums, and zoos

Boston Athenæum – one of the oldest independent libraries in the United States
Boston Children's Museum
Boston Tea Party Ships and Museum – on the Fort Point Channel, includes a full-scale replica of the Eleanor and Beaver, two of the ships involved in the event
Edward M. Kennedy Institute for the United States Senate – specialty museum with a full-scale reproduction of the U.S. Senate Chamber
Franklin Park Zoo
Gibson House Museum
Harrison Gray Otis House
Institute of Contemporary Art
Isabella Stewart Gardner Museum – art museum focusing on European art
John F. Kennedy Presidential Library and Museum – presidential library
The Mary Baker Eddy Library and Mapparium – cultural and historical museum/library
Museum of Fine Arts – art museum
Museum of Science – science museum, including an IMAX theater and planetarium
New England Aquarium
Nichols House Museum
Old South Meeting House
Old State House
Prescott House
USS Cassin Young – decorated Fletcher-class destroyer from World War II
USS Constitution Museum – a hands-on museum that collects, preserves, and interprets the history of Old Ironsides
Warren Anatomical Museum

Neighborhoods and districts

Parks and squares

Arnold Arboretum
Boston Common
Boston Public Garden
Charles River and Esplanade
Copley Square
Kenmore Square
Garden of Peace
Rose Kennedy Greenway

Performing arts centers
Boston Opera House
Citi Performing Arts Center
Cutler Majestic Theatre
Jordan Hall at the New England Conservatory of Music
Symphony Hall – home of the Boston Symphony Orchestra and Boston Pops Orchestra

Religious buildings

Cathedral Church of St. Paul - Episcopal church
Cathedral of the Holy Cross - Roman Catholic church
Old North Church - Episcopal church
Old South Church - United Church of Christ church
The First Church of Christ, Scientist - Christian Science
Trinity Church, Back Bay, an Episcopal church
First Church in Boston, Back Bay, Unitarian Universalist church designed by Paul Rudolph

Restaurants and pubs
Bull & Finch Pub – whose building is known from the television show Cheers
Legal Sea Foods – well known seafood restaurant with 11 locations in Boston
Union Oyster House – oldest restaurant in the United States

Shopping areas
Copley Place
Downtown Crossing
Newbury Street
Prudential Center
Quincy Market – part of the larger Faneuil Hall Marketplace

Sports arenas and stadiums

Agganis Arena at Boston University
Fenway Park – home of the Boston Red Sox
Harvard Stadium
Suffolk Downs
Nickerson Field
TD Garden – home of the Boston Bruins and the Boston Celtics, formerly named the FleetCenter, this arena replaced the Boston Garden in 1995

Tours
Boston By Foot – offers guided architectural and historical walking tours of various Boston neighborhoods, including Beacon Hill, Back Bay, the North End, and the Freedom Trail
Boston Duck Tours – guided-tour that uses World War II-era duck boats
Boston HarborWalk – tour designed to allow people to walk the entire shore of Boston Harbor
Harpoon Brewery – free beer samples
Samuel Adams Brewery – free guided tour of the brewery demonstrating each step of the beer making process and ending with samplings of different varieties

Other
Autumn foliage – in the outer suburbs of Boston, whose vibrant color attracts many tourists

Notes

References

External links
Greater Boston Convention & Visitors Bureau

Boston-related lists

Culture of Boston
Boston Sites